The large moth family Gelechiidae contains the following genera:

Macracaena
Macrenches
Macrocalcara

Magonympha
Megacraspedus
Melitoxestis
Melitoxoides
Menecratistis
Meridorma
Merimnetria
Mesophleps
Metabolaea
Metanarsia
Metaplatyntis
Metatactis
Meteoristis
Metopios
Metopleura
Metzneria
Mirificarma
Mnesistega
Molopostola
Mometa
Monochroa
Myconita

References

 Natural History Museum Lepidoptera genus database

Gelechiidae
Gelechiid